Tawhanga Nopeara is a Maori academic and artist. He is of takatapui identity, and of Te Arawa, Ngati Tuwharetoa and Ngapuhi descent.

Education 
Nopera completed a creative practice Ph.D. from the University of Waikato in 2016. He is the first graduate from the creative practice PhD programme. His thesis was entitled, "huka can haka: Taonga performing tino rangatiratanga."

Career 
Nopera is a leading Kaupapa Maori thinker on topics such as indigenous trauma, Maori sexuality, indigenous identity issues, and takatapui culture.

His work is part of the permanent collection of the Bishop Museum in Honolulu; and the C.N. Gorman Museum at the University of California at Davis. He did a presentation on digital storytelling as a visiting scholar.

Tāwhanga is an advocate for people living with HIV in Aoteaora, New Zealand; and has been on the board of Body Positive Aotearoa since 2016. Tāwhanga is the current Co-Chair. Nopera is on the board of advisors of Visual Aids.

Personal life 
Nopera identifies as takatāpui.

Bibliography 
Nopera, T. (2015) Tranny Tricks: The Blending and Contouring of Raranga Research, Journal of Global Indigeneity, 1(1), 2015.

References

External links
 

New Zealand Māori academics
New Zealand Māori artists
University of Waikato alumni
Living people
New Zealand LGBT artists
Ngāti Tūwharetoa people
Ngāpuhi people
Year of birth missing (living people)